The Kentucky Senate is the upper house of the Kentucky General Assembly.  The Kentucky Senate is composed of 38 members elected from single-member districts throughout the Commonwealth.  There are no term limits for Kentucky senators. The Kentucky Senate meets at the Kentucky State Capitol in Frankfort annually beginning in January. Sessions last for 60 legislative days in even-numbered years and 30 legislative days in odd-numbered years.

Republicans have had control of the Senate since 2000. They currently hold 30 seats to Democrats' 7, while one seat remains vacant.

Terms and qualifications
According to Section 32 of the Kentucky Constitution, a state senator must:

be at least 30 years old;
be a citizen of Kentucky;
have resided in the state at least six years and the district at least one year prior to election.
Per section 30 of the Kentucky Constitution, senators are elected to four year staggered terms, with half the Senate elected every two years.

Leadership
Prior to a 1992 constitutional amendment, the Lieutenant Governor of Kentucky presided over the Senate; the 1992 amendment created a new office of President of the Senate to be held by one of the 38 senators.

Leaders

President (elected by full body): Robert Stivers (R-25)
President pro tempore (elected by full body): David P. Givens (R-9)

Additionally, each political party elects a floor leader, whip, and caucus chairman.

Current party leadership of the Kentucky Senate:
 Republican Party
Leader: Damon Thayer (R-17)
Whip: Mike Wilson (R-32)
Caucus chair: Julie Raque Adams (R-36)
 Democratic Party
Leader: Gerald Neal (D-33)
Whip: David Yates (D-37)
Caucus chair: Reggie Thomas (D-13)

Members

List of current senators

2023 Special Elections 

 On February 21, 2023, a special election was held to fill the vacant 19th district Senate seat left by Morgan McGarvey. The seat opened up after McGarvey ran and won the U.S. House seat in Kentucky's 3rd congressional district. Democratic candidate Cassie Chambers Armstrong defeated Republican candidate Misty Glin to become Senator. 

 On May 16, 2023, a special election will be held to fill the vacant 28th district Senate seat left by Ralph Alvarado. The seat opened up after Alvarado was appointed the 15th Commissioner of the Tennessee Department of Health. The candidates are Greg Elkins (R) of Winchester, Robert Sainte (D) of Winchester, and former Kentucky State Representative Richard Henderson (I) of Mt. Sterling.

History
Carolyn Conn Moore became the first woman to serve in the Kentucky Senate when in November 1949 she won a special election to replace her husband, J. Lee Moore, in the legislature after his death. Georgia Davis Powers became the first person of color to be elected to the Kentucky Senate in 1967. Gerald Neal became the first African American ever to be elected to a leadership position in the Kentucky General Assembly in 2014. Ralph Alvarado became the first Hispanic to serve in the Kentucky General Assembly when he was elected in 2014.

Standing committees
.

Past composition of the Senate

See also
Kentucky House of Representatives
Government of Kentucky

References

External links
Kentucky Legislature Senate Members official government website
State Senate of Kentucky at Project Vote Smart

Kentucky General Assembly
State upper houses in the United States